This was the first edition of the tournament. Wesley Koolhof and Matwé Middelkoop won the title, beating Sergei Bubka and Aleksandr Nedovyesov 6–1, 6–4

Seeds

Draw

Draw

References
 Main Draw

Aegon GB Pro-Series Glasgow - Doubles